Loïc Lapoussin (born 27 March 1996) is a professional footballer who plays as a midfielder for Royale Union Saint-Gilloise. Born in France, Lapoussin represents the Madagascar national team.

Club career
On 27 July 2018, the first matchday of the 2018–19 season, Lapoussin made his Ligue 2 debut with Red Star F.C. in a 2–1 home defeat to Niort.

In summer 2019, he joined Belgian First Division B side R.E. Virton.

After being linked with moves to Beerschot and Charleroi, Lapoussin moved to Royale Union Saint-Gilloise, also of the First Division B, in July 2020.

International career
Lapoussin was born in France, and is of Malagasy descent. Lapoussin debuted with the Madagascar national team in a 2–1 2021 Africa Cup of Nations qualification loss to Ivory Coast on 12 November 2020.

Career statistics

Club

References

External links
 

Living people
1996 births
Association football midfielders
People with acquired Malagasy citizenship
Malagasy footballers
Madagascar international footballers
French footballers
French sportspeople of Malagasy descent
Malagasy expatriate footballers
French expatriate footballers
Ligue 2 players
Championnat National players
Challenger Pro League players
Red Star F.C. players
R.E. Virton players
Royale Union Saint-Gilloise players
French expatriate sportspeople in Belgium
Expatriate footballers in Belgium
People from Rosny-sous-Bois